Madargan (also Romanized as Mādargān; also known as Mādarkān and Mādarkūn) is a village in Emamzadeh Abdol Aziz Rural District, Jolgeh District, Isfahan County, Isfahan Province, Iran. At the 2006 census, its population was 218, in 53 families.

References 

Populated places in Isfahan County